Kou Hoi In is the elected President of the Legislative Assembly of Macau. He was elected with a 32 vote majority from the 33 sworn in legislators of Macoa.

References

External links
https://www.gov.mo/en/chiefs/kou-hoi-in/

Living people
Macau politicians
Year of birth missing (living people)